The Bangkok Bus Terminal (Chatuchak), colloquially known as Mo Chit 2 or New Mo Chit, is one of the main long-distance bus stations serving Greater Bangkok. It is operated by the state enterprise The Transport Co., Ltd., and serves as the main gateway to and from the northern and northeastern provinces for those travelling by bus.

The station is located on Kamphaeng Phet 2 Road in Bangkok's Chatuchak District, near Queen Sirikit Park. It began operations on 8 April 1998, replacing the older Mo Chit Bus Terminal, whose location was being converted for the construction of the main BTS Skytrain depot. The station serves as many as 150,000 daily passengers, especially during the peak New Year and Songkran seasons.

The station was originally planned as a temporary station, with a new station planned over the BTS depot, following a 1994 cabinet resolution. However, legal complications prevented the original plan from being completed. By the 2010s, the station faced relocation to make way for facilities of the new Bang Sue Grand Station of the State Railway of Thailand, who owns the land. Multiple options were considered, including reviving the original plan, moving to the Rangsit area, and building a new bus terminal near the present area, with tentative plans changing many times.

References

Bus stations in Thailand
Bus transport in Bangkok
Chatuchak district